Adekunle “Nodash” Adejuyigbe, is a Nigerian film maker and producer; He has served as a producer and executive producer for several documentaries and commercials for international organisations and is considered one of the most outstanding directors and one of the most sought after cinematographers of the New Nigerian Cinema.

Adekunle “Nodash” Adejuyigbe commenced his career in a TV network as Producer, Writer and Director of TV shows and documentaries, he ultimately became the Creative Director and Head of Production of the TV network before leaving to start his film production company - Something Unusual Studios.

In 2015, he was shortlisted as one of the 21 Cinematographers from around the world to participate in the exclusive, strictly-by-invitation Cinematography Master Classes organised by The Berlin Film Festival, Germany and has since become a household name and the go-to for technical support for the best films to come out of Nigeria. He is the Team Lead of “The Elite Film Team” - Nigeria’s most internationally compliant film team.

Adekunle “Nodash” Adejuyigbe is the Writer, Director and Producer of the critically acclaimed movie, “The Delivery Boy” which has become the classic of modern Nigerian cinema filmmaking. “The Delivery Boy” has screened in 4 continents to brilliant reviews and it won the best Nigerian Film Award at Africa International Film Festival (AFRIFF) 2018.

Adekunle “Nodash” Adejuyigbe has won various awards and with commendations for his directing, writing, producing and cinematography talent-he possesses an uncanny ability to create artistic, emotional pictures, to deeply analyse stories and find a way to creatively and technically express them.

Awards and accolades
In 2015, Nodash was selected as one of the 21 Cinematographers shortlisted from all over the world to partake in the exclusive, strictly-by-invitation Cinematography Master Class organised by the Berlin International Film Festival in Germany.
Best Editing 2013 Nollywood Movies Awards for the movie Journey to Self, 2013
Best Editor, IN Short International Film festival in Lagos, done in collaboration with Goethe Institute, 2011
Best Editing, Nigerian Movie Award for the movie, The Young Smoker,  2011
Best Cinematographer and Best Editor,  Nigerian Music Video Awards, 2011

Filmography
2017: Director of Photography, The Bridge 
2017: Director of Photography, The Tribunal 
2016: Director, Director of Photography, Gidi Up Season 3
2016: Director of Photography, Editor, Isoken (2017 film)
2015: Second Unit, Cinematographer, Fifty (film)
2015: Director of Photography, The Encounter
2015: Cinematographer, Ireti
2013: Editor, Director of Photography Journey to Self

See also
 List of Nigerian film producers

References

External links 
 

Nigerian film directors
University of Ilorin alumni
Living people
Year of birth missing (living people)
Nigerian cinematographers
Nigerian film producers
Nigerian editors